Uilliams Bomfim Souza (born 17 January 1989), commonly known as Uilliams, is a Brazilian footballer who played as a striker for Shillong Lajong in the Indian I-League.

Career
On 8 September 2013 it was announced that Uilliams has signed with Shillong Lajong

References

External links
 

Brazilian footballers
1989 births
Living people
Sportspeople from Bahia
Expatriate footballers in India
I-League players
Shillong Lajong FC players
Brazilian expatriate sportspeople in India
Association football forwards